Gary Clark (born 13 September 1964) is a Scottish former professional footballer who played as a midfielder.

Career
He played for Pollok Juniors in 1985 and won the League, Scottish Cup and Cup Winners Cup. He then joined Falkirk (apps 12 goals 2) in the Scottish 1st Division in 1986 the year they won promotion to the Scottish Premier League. Stayed there until the following season where he was freed and went to play for Sunshine George Cross (apps 39 goals 13) in Australia. He played in the National Soccer League until November 1988, moved back to Scotland and then played for Sliema Wanderers for six months in Malta (apps 12 goals 1) Davie Provan signed for Albion Rovers (apps 21 goals 10) until the end of season May 1989. He was then signed by John Clark for Clyde, £10,000, (apps 26 goals 11) for the season 1989/90.

Billy McLaren paid £60,000 to take him to Hamilton Academical (apps 258 goals 72). During the 8 seasons with the 'Accies' he won 2 Challenge Cup Winners medals and played under the management of Iain Munro, Sandy Clark and Colin Miller. Terry Christie signed him for Alloa Athletic (apps 24 goals 5) for season 1999-2000 and the team went on to win promotion and the Challenge Cup. At the end of that season he left Alloa FC and Ally Dawson took him back to Hamilton Academicals, where they won the League, for his last season in senior football.

In his time with Hamilton he took Paul Hartley under his wing.

He was also a witness in HM Advocate v Sheridan and Sheridan.

Honours

Player
Hamilton Academical
Scottish Challenge Cup 1991–92, 1992–93

Alloa Athletic
Scottish Challenge Cup 1999–2000

References

External links

1964 births
Living people
Footballers from Glasgow
Scottish footballers
Association football midfielders
Pollok F.C. players
Falkirk F.C. players
Caroline Springs George Cross FC players
Sliema Wanderers F.C. players
Albion Rovers F.C. players
Clyde F.C. players
Hamilton Academical F.C. players
Alloa Athletic F.C. players
Scottish Junior Football Association players
Scottish Football League players
National Soccer League (Australia) players
Maltese Premier League players
Scottish expatriate footballers
Scottish expatriate sportspeople in Australia
Scottish expatriate sportspeople in Malta
Expatriate soccer players in Australia
Expatriate footballers in Malta